Jeff Atwood (1970) is an American software developer, author, blogger, and entrepreneur. He co-founded the computer programming question-and-answer website Stack Overflow and co-founded Stack Exchange, which extends Stack Overflow's question-and-answer model to subjects other than programming. He is the owner and writer of the computer programming blog Coding Horror, focused on programming and human factors.

As of 2012, Jeff Atwood's most recent project was Discourse, an open source Internet discussion platform.

Career

Atwood started a programming blog, Coding Horror, in 2004. As a result, he met Joel Spolsky, among others.

In 2007, Jeff Atwood made the quote that was popularly referred to as Atwood’s Law:“Any application that can be written in JavaScript, will eventually be written in JavaScript.”In 2008, together with Spolsky, Atwood founded Stack Overflow, a programming question-and-answer website. The site quickly became very popular, and was followed by Server Fault for system administrators, and Super User for general computer-related questions, eventually becoming the Stack Exchange network which includes many Q&A websites about topics decided on by the community.

From 2008 to 2014, Atwood and Spolsky published a weekly podcast covering the progress on Stack Exchange and a wide range of software development issues. Jeff Atwood was also a keynote presenter at the 2008 Canadian University Software Engineering Conference.

In February 2012, Atwood left Stack Exchange so he could spend more time with his family.

On February 5, 2013, Atwood announced his new company, Civilized Discourse Construction Kit, Inc. Its flagship product is an open source next-generation discussion platform called Discourse. Atwood and others developed it out of their frustration with current bulletin board software that hadn't seemed to evolve since 1990. On February 1, 2023, he stepped down as CEO and assumed the role of Executive Chairman.

He also launched a mechanical keyboard called CODE in 2013.

Books 
 The ASP.NET 2.0 Anthology: 101 Essential Tips, Tricks & Hacks, by Scott Allen, Jeff Atwood, Wyatt Barnett, Jon Galloway and Phil Haack. 
 Effective Programming: More Than Writing Code.

References

External links 

 Profile on Coding Horror

1970 births
Living people
Web developers
American male bloggers
American bloggers
American computer programmers